The Portent is a comic book by , published by Image Comics. Bergting writes, draws and colors the comic himself. In a world set in its twilight days, the series follows Milo, a deeply troubled warrior, on his quest for redemption through a land beset by demons and the spirits of the dead.

External links 
Creator Peter Bergting's homepage
The complete first issue - Available in electronic form for free.

Image Comics titles